The Company may refer to:

Organizations 
 Central Intelligence Agency (CIA), an American spy agency
 Indian mafia, an organised body of criminals based in India
 Society of Jesus, the Christian Catholic Order of Saint Ignatius of Loyola, aka the Jesuits
The Company (Hawaiian organized crime), a crime syndicate active in Hawaii from the 1960s to 1990s
British East India Company, active in early British trade and colonization in India

Arts, entertainment, and media

Fictional entities
 The Company (Heroes), a covert international organization in the television series Heroes
 The Company (Prison Break), a covert international organization in the television series Prison Break
 The Company, a covert international organization in the television series The Equalizer
 Dr. Zeus Inc., also known as The Company, a fictional entity in series of science fiction novels by Kage Baker
 Zzyzx, a covert organization in the television series Kyle XY, which was often referred to as simply "The Company" throughout the first season
 Weyland-Yutani, often referred as "The Company", a fictional megacorporation in the Alien universe

Literature 
 The Company (Ehrlichman novel), a 1976 novel by John Ehrlichman
 The Company (Littell novel), a 2002 novel by Robert Littell
 The Company, a time travel series of novels by Kage Baker

Music
 The Company (folk rock band), a short-lived American band
 The Company (vocal group), based in the Philippines
 The company, a band started by ex-Falling in Reverse member Anthony Avila

Production companies
 The Company (production company), an India-based TV production company
 The Company, a U.S.-based TV and film production company co-founded by Charlie Ebersol

Other uses in arts, entertainment, and media
 The Company (film), a 2003 film by Robert Altman about the Joffrey Ballet of Chicago
 The Company (TV miniseries), a miniseries about the CIA based on Littell's 2002 novel

See also
 Company (disambiguation)
 La Compagnie (ICAO: DJT) "DreamJet" airline